I Do, Let's Eat! is a Food Network (Canada) television series featuring the nuptial cuisine of diverse cultures.

The main focus of the show is the wedding banquet of couples from different origins. The menu is assembled according to the ethnicity of the bride and groom and their families. The chef of the event takes a leading role in each episode, but the preparation of the venue is also showcased, as is the service during the actual event.

This program is also shown in the U.S. on WEtv, as well as in India, Hong Kong and the UK.

Food Network (Canadian TV channel) original programming
Food reality television series
Wedding television shows
Canadian dating and relationship reality television series